Maurycy Pius Rudzki (born 1862, d. 1916) was the first person to call himself a professor of geophysics. He held the Chair of Geophysics at the Jagiellonian University in Kraków, and established the Institute of Geophysics there in 1895.  His research specialty was elastic anisotropy, as applied to wave propagation in the earth, and he established many of the fundamental results in that arena.

References

1862 births
1916 deaths
Academic staff of Jagiellonian University
Polish geophysicists